Shuanggang Station, formerly Wenyuan Station during planning, is a station of Line 13 of the Guangzhou Metro in Huangpu District.

Station layout

Exits

References

Guangzhou Metro stations in Huangpu District
Railway stations in China opened in 2017